Sylvan Place might refer to two places in New York City.

Sylvan Terrace, sometimes erroneously called Sylvan Place, is historic grouping of 20 three-story, wood-framed townhouses or mews straddling a cobblestone street lined with coachlights leading directly to the Morris-Jumel Mansion and located in the Jumel Terrace Historic District of the Manhattan's Washington Heights neighborhood.

Sylvan Place is a former small street running from East 120th Street to East 121st Street, between and parallel to Lexington Avenue and Third Avenue in Manhattan. The signage for the street still exists. The street's ground area now serves as Harlem Art Park and the Harlem Courthouse's frontage and parking lot. Directly opposite Sylvan Place on East 121st Street, Sylvan Court Mews, or Sylvan Court, which is sometimes confused with Sylvan Place, is a small dead end private street that is unpaved, and contains several 1880s townhouses. Unlike in other parts of these city with similar houses, like Greenwich Village and Brooklyn Heights, the small street and court have not been restored. Both Sylvan Place and Sylvan Court were part of the former East Post Road, which led from the city to Boston. The intersection of the East Post Road, Kingsbridge Post Road, Harlem Road, and Church Lane formed a five-cornered intersection, and the neighborhood that surrounded it was sometimes known as the Five Points, not to be confused with the neighborhood of the same name in lower Manhattan. Sylvan Place and Sylvan Court met at the former five-pointed intersection.

References
Notes

Neighborhoods in Manhattan
Streets in Manhattan
East Harlem